Anthony Chan (born c. 1957) is Managing Director, Chief Economist at JPMorgan Chase & Co. in New York City. He appears several times per month on CNBC, and is often featured in other media outlets such as Fox Business News, CNN, Reuters, Squawk Box, Bloomberg Television, and public television's Nightly Business Report.

Chan, a Puerto Rican-Chinese-American, earned his B.B.A. in Finance and Investments degree from Baruch College in 1979, and his master's (1983) and doctorate (1986) from the University of Maryland. He has worked as a professor at the University of Dayton, and was an economist at the Federal Reserve Bank and at Barclays. He has been with JPMorgan Chase since 1994. From 1985 to 1986, Chan was a Doctoral fellow at the Board of Governors of the Federal Reserve in Washington, D.C.

See also
 Chinese Americans in New York City

References

1950s births
Living people
21st-century American economists
Baruch College alumni
University of Maryland, College Park alumni
American academics of Chinese descent
Puerto Rican economists
JPMorgan Chase employees